Aleix Febas Pérez (born 2 February 1996) is a Spanish professional footballer who plays as a central midfielder for Málaga CF.

Club career
Born in Lleida, Catalonia, Febas joined Real Madrid's youth setup in 2009 at the age of 13, from UE Lleida. He made his senior debut with the C-team on 7 September 2014 by starting in a 2–3 Tercera División home loss against Fútbol Alcobendas Sport, and scored his first goal on 21 December in a home loss to UD San Sebastián de los Reyes for the same scoreline.

On 5 July 2015, Febas was promoted to the reserves in Segunda División B by manager Zinedine Zidane. He made his debut for the B-side on 22 August, starting in a 5–1 home routing of CD Ebro.

On 30 January 2016 Febas scored his first senior goal for Castilla, netting the first in a 2–1 away win against Real Sociedad B. He also scored doubles against SD Amorebieta (4–1 away success) and Sestao River Club (3–1 home win) in February 2016, and finished the season with nine goals as his side missed out promotion in the play-offs.

On 8 November 2016, after still being a regular starter under Santiago Solari, Febas renewed his contract. The following 11 July, he was loaned to Segunda División club Real Zaragoza, for one year.

Febas made his professional debut on 18 August 2017, starting in a 0–1 away loss against CD Tenerife.  On 10 July of the following year, he was loaned to Albacete Balompié for one year.

On 12 July 2019, Febas agreed to a four-year contract with RCD Mallorca, newly promoted to La Liga. On 7 January 2022, he was loaned to Málaga CF in the second division for the remainder of the campaign.

On 4 July 2022, Febas signed a permanent three-year contract with Málaga.

Notes

References

External links
Profile at the Málaga CF website

1996 births
Living people
Sportspeople from Lleida
Spanish footballers
Footballers from Catalonia
Association football midfielders
La Liga players
Segunda División players
Segunda División B players
Tercera División players
Real Madrid C footballers
Real Madrid Castilla footballers
Real Zaragoza players
Albacete Balompié players
RCD Mallorca players
Málaga CF players
Spain youth international footballers